Proterra is the twelfth album by the Scottish Celtic rock band Runrig, with Paul Mounsey.

Track listing
 "The Old Boys" - 5:16
 "Proterra" - 5:35
 "Day of Days" - 3:38
 "Empty Glens" - 3:51
 "Gabriel's Sword" - 4:57
 "From the North" - 5:28
 "An Toll Dubh" (The Dungeon) - 2:28
 "There's a Need" - 3:34
 "Faileas air an Àirigh" (Shadow on the Sheiling) - 4:06
 "Heading to Acadia" - 4:16
 "All the Miles" - 4:16
 "A Rèiteach" (The Betrothal) - 5:19
 "Angels from the Ashes" - 3:25

Personnel
Runrig
Iain Bayne - drums, percussion
Bruce Guthro - lead vocals
Brian Hurren - keyboards, vocals
Malcolm Jones - guitars, accordion, vocals, pipes
Calum Macdonald - percussion, vocals
Rory Macdonald - vocals, bass guitar

Runrig albums
2003 albums
Scottish Gaelic music